Ralph Hudson (died January 22, 1963) was the last person to be executed by New Jersey.

A native of Coatesville, Pennsylvania, Hudson was tried and convicted of stabbing his estranged wife Myrtle Hudson to death as she worked in an Atlantic City, New Jersey, restaurant on December 27, 1960. Hudson had been convicted of assault and battery four months earlier and was sentenced to six months in jail but had been let out for Christmas.

Hudson turned down a plea deal for second degree murder and said he deserved to die. He was convicted of first degree murder and sentenced to death.

Hudson was executed by electric chair in the Trenton State Prison. Although other prisoners were sentenced to death by New Jersey after Hudson, no prisoner has been executed since Hudson.

The New Jersey Legislature voted to abolish the death penalty in 2007, and the measure was signed into law by Governor Jon S. Corzine.

See also 

 List of most recent executions by jurisdiction
 List of people executed in New Jersey

References 

1920 births
1963 deaths
20th-century executions by New Jersey
American people executed for murder
Legal history of New Jersey
People convicted of murder by New Jersey
People executed by New Jersey by electric chair
People from Coatesville, Pennsylvania
20th-century executions of American people
Executed people from Pennsylvania